New World University is a private university in Roseau, Dominica. It offers a one-year undergraduate certificate, a two-year undergraduate diploma, and a three years Bachelor of Science degree in International Business Leadership. It also sponsors research, including Sub-Saharan Monitor, which tracks political, economic, and cultural news and trends in Africa south of the Sahara.

References

External links
New World University official site

Educational institutions established in 2010
Universities and colleges in Dominica
2010 establishments in Dominica